Didier Guillaume (born 11 May 1959) is a French politician who served as Minister of Agriculture and Food in the government of Prime Minister Édouard Philippe from 2018 to 2020. A member of the Socialist Party until 2018, he was President of the General Council of Drôme from 2004 to 2015, Senator for Drôme from 2008 to 2018 and president of the Socialist group in the Senate from 2014 to 2018.

Early political career
In 2004, after his election as President of the General Council of Drôme, Guillaume resigned his post as Mayor of Bourg-de-Péage, which he had held since the 1995 municipal election. The town is the chef-lieu of the canton of Bourg-de-Péage, represented by Guillaume in the Drôme General Council from 1998 until 2015.

Senator for Drôme
In 2008, Guillaume was elected to the Senate. He served as First Vice President of the Senate under the leadership of President Jean-Pierre Bel from 2011 to 2014, when he became president of the Socialist group and Leader of the Opposition in the Senate, as the right had won a majority at the 2014 election.

After leaving the presidency of the Drôme General Council following the victory of The Republicans at the 2015 departmental election, he was succeeded by Patrick Kanner as group president in the Senate in 2018. Guillaume also worked as Manuel Valls's campaign director in the Socialist Party's primaries for the 2017 presidential election.

Minister of Agriculture
Guillaume served as Minister of Agriculture and Food under Prime Minister Édouard Philippe from 2018 to 2020, succeeding Stéphane Travert. After taking office, he vowed to take his decisions "in independence" from the industry lobbies. He stated he would run for Mayor of Biarritz in 2020 against fellow government member Jean-Baptiste Lemoyne, but they both withdrew their candidacies before the election.

During the COVID-19 pandemic, Gulliaume called on unemployed citizens to help the country's farmers in their production process as seasonal foreign workers were absent. 50 000 people responded favourably. He was succeeded by Julien Denormandie and retired from politics.

References

Sources
Page on the Senate website

1959 births
Living people
French Ministers of Agriculture
French Senators of the Fifth Republic
Vice-presidents of the Senate (France)
People from Drôme
Senators of Drôme
Socialist Party (France) politicians
Mayors of places in Auvergne-Rhône-Alpes